James Laurence McLear (21 December 1896 – 26 November 1968) was an Australian rules footballer who played with Essendon in the Victorian Football League (VFL).

Notes

External links 
		

1896 births
1968 deaths
Australian rules footballers from Victoria (Australia)
Essendon Football Club players